The 1999–2000 Wisconsin Badgers men's basketball team represented University of Wisconsin–Madison in the 1999–2000 NCAA Division I men's basketball season. The head coach was Dick Bennett, coaching his fifth season with the Badgers. The team played its home games at the Kohl Center in Madison, Wisconsin and was a member of the Big Ten Conference. Wisconsin finished the season 22–14, 8–8 in Big Ten play to finish in sixth place. The Badgers received an at-large bid to the NCAA tournament as a No. 8 seed in the West Region. They defeated Fresno State, Arizona, Louisiana State and Purdue en route to the Final Four before losing to Michigan State, 53–41, in Indianapolis.

Roster

Schedule

|-
!colspan=12| Regular Season

|-
!colspan=12| Big Ten tournament

|-
!colspan=12| NCAA tournament

Records & trivia 
Tony Bennett was a member of the support staff, officially listed as a team manager in the team's media guide.

References

Wisconsin Badgers men's basketball seasons
Wisconsin
Wisconsin
NCAA Division I men's basketball tournament Final Four seasons
Badge
Badge